A sarafan (from  sarāpā, literally "[from] head to feet") is a long, trapezoidal Russian jumper dress (pinafore dress) worn by girls and women and forming part of Russian traditional folk costume.

Traditional Russian costume consists of straight, flowing lines. Beginning at the turn of the 18th century, the sarafan became the most popular article of peasant women's clothing in the Northern and Central regions of Russia. Sarafans were regularly worn until well into the 20th century, having first been mentioned in chronicles dating back to the year 1376. The origin of the term Sarafan lies in Persia, but the structure of the sarafan was inspired by Viking women clothing. Old Russia cultivated especially during the era of Grand Principality of Moscow strong ties to Western Asia and Southwest Asia and served also as an intermediary in the trade between European countries like Sweden, and Asian countries like Persia, and what is today Turkey. The sarafan most likely originated from a kaftan-like costume that was worn in Russia by women and men. Sarafans became most popular in the Central and Northern Russian regions. Through trade with Central Europe, the quality and colour of clothes grew.

Sarafans had originally a tighter form but became wider through the influence of the Russian Orthodox Church.

After the reforms of Peter the Great, which also introduced various Westernised or modernised cultural standards to Russia (with contention), only peasants wore the sarafan for daily use, while the upper classes switched to Central European fashion.

In many areas of the former Grand Principality of Moscow and today's Southern Russia the poneva costume was also worn by women. Today the garment is most often seen at performances of Russian folk song and dance, and is worn on Russian folk and religious holidays. Designers from Russia, Belarus, and Ukraine are re-imagining the sarafan style with its old national heritage for the 21st century as a summertime light dress that can be with its modern shape a part of today's woman's wardrobe.

The outer layer of a Matryoshka doll is traditionally depicted as wearing a sarafan.

Gallery

References

External links 

14th-century fashion
15th-century fashion
16th-century fashion
17th-century fashion
18th-century fashion
19th-century fashion
Russian folk clothing